Matthew Zachary Jarrett Read (born June 14, 1986) is a Canadian professional ice hockey player who is currently an unrestricted free agent. He most recently played for the Toronto Marlies of the American Hockey League (AHL). He previously played in the National Hockey League (NHL) for the Philadelphia Flyers, who signed him as an undrafted free agent in 2011, and the Minnesota Wild.

Playing career

Minor
Read started playing hockey on Vancouver Island playing for the Kerry Park Islanders. At the age of ten, he moved to Colorado Springs, Colorado, and played for Pikes Peak Minor Hockey for four years. He then moved to Ilderton, Ontario, and played for the Ilderton Jets of the OMHA's Shamrock League.

Junior/Collegiate
After being a finalist in the OMHA Bantam Championship, Read's team won the championship in his first year of midget, with Ilderton defeating Centre Hastings in four games. From minor hockey, Read played OHA Junior D hockey for the Lucan Irish in the 2003–04 season.

In 2004–05, Read signed with the nearby St. Marys Lincolns Junior B club of the Western Ontario Hockey League (WOHL). He spent two seasons with the Lincolns.

In the 2004–05 season, Read was runner up to future NHLer Logan Couture for the WOHL Rookie of the Year Award. Couture, a graduate of the Lucan Irish of the Shamrock League, played that season with the St. Thomas Stars before being an Ontario Hockey League (OHL) first round draft pick in 2005.

The following season, Read signed with the Milton Icehawks Junior A club of the Ontario Junior Hockey League (OJHL) for 2005–06. In 2006–07, Read spent a season with the Des Moines Buccaneers of the United States Hockey League (USHL).

Professional
Read signed a three-year contract as a free agent with the Philadelphia Flyers on March 24, 2011, after playing four seasons of collegiate hockey with Bemidji State University. Read made the Flyers roster out of training camp heading into the 2011–12 season and made his NHL debut on October 6, 2011, against the Boston Bruins. He scored his first NHL goal on October 8 against Martin Brodeur of the New Jersey Devils. On October 18, Read recorded a career-high four points (one goal and three assists) in a 7–2 Flyers win over the Ottawa Senators. Read participated in the All-Star SuperSkills Competition and finished second in the accuracy contest, behind Dallas Stars forward Jamie Benn. Read finished the regular season leading all NHL rookies in goals scored, 24, and ranking fourth among all rookies in points, 47.

During the 2012–13 NHL lock-out, Read moved overseas to Europe to play for Södertälje SK of the Allsvenskan, Sweden's second-tier hockey league. He recorded 24 points in 20 games.

Shortly after play resumed to begin the 2012–13 season in January, Read scored his first career NHL hat-trick on January 26, 2013, against the Florida Panthers, scoring on goaltenders José Théodore and Scott Clemmensen. Following the shortened season, Read was invited to play for Team Canada at the 2013 IIHF World Championships.

On September 20, 2013, Read signed a four-year, $14.5 million contract extension with the Flyers.

On October 8, 2015, Read scored the first goal of the 2015–16 season for the Flyers in the season opener against the Tampa Bay Lightning.

On July 30, 2018, Read signed a one-year, two way contract with the Minnesota Wild.

On August 2, 2019, as a free agent from the Wild, Read signed a professional tryout contract (PTO) with the Toronto Maple Leafs. After participating in training camp and the pre-season he was signed to a one-year AHL contract with affiliate, the Toronto Marlies, on September 30, 2019.

Personal life
In July 2014, Read married his longtime girlfriend, Erin Cody. On March 17, 2015, they gave birth to their first child, a daughter.

Career statistics

Regular season and playoffs

International

Awards and honours

References

External links

 

1986 births
Adirondack Phantoms players
Bemidji State Beavers men's ice hockey players
Canadian ice hockey right wingers
Des Moines Buccaneers players
Ice hockey people from Ontario
Iowa Wild players
Lehigh Valley Phantoms players
Living people
Minnesota Wild players
People from Middlesex County, Ontario
Philadelphia Flyers players
Södertälje SK players
Toronto Marlies players
Undrafted National Hockey League players
AHCA Division I men's ice hockey All-Americans